The 1949 Masters Tournament was the 13th Masters Tournament, held April 7–10 at Augusta National Golf Club in Augusta, Georgia.  This was the first year that the famous Green Jacket was awarded to the tournament winner, and previous champions were awarded theirs retroactively.

Sam Snead shot consecutive rounds of 67 on the weekend to win by three strokes over runners-up Johnny Bulla and Lloyd Mangrum. This was the first of his three Masters victories and the third of his seven major championships. Snead also won the next major, the PGA Championship in May, and became the first to win those two in the same calendar year. He was followed by Jack Burke Jr. (1956) and Jack Nicklaus (1963, 1975); they completed their doubles in the summer (July, August).

Previous champions of both the Masters and PGA Championship, won in different calendar years, were Gene Sarazen, Byron Nelson, and Henry Picard.

Defending tour player of the year Ben Hogan did not play in the majors in 1949, due to a near-fatal automobile collision in west Texas in early February. Prior to the accident, he had won twice in January and was a runner-up in a playoff. Hogan returned to the tour on a limited basis in 1950 and won six more majors (nine total), including the Masters in 1951 and 1953. He finished fourth in 1950, in his first major back.

Founder and host Bobby Jones (1902–1971) played in his last Masters the year before; diagnosed with syringomyelia and recovering from spinal surgery, this was his first as a spectator.

Field
1. Masters champions
Jimmy Demaret (9,10,12), Claude Harmon (9,12), Herman Keiser (9,10), Byron Nelson (2,6,9), Henry Picard (6), Gene Sarazen (2,4,6,9), Horton Smith, Craig Wood (2)
Ralph Guldahl (2) did not play.

2. U.S. Open champions
Billy Burke, Johnny Farrell, Lawson Little (3,5), Lloyd Mangrum (9,10), Lew Worsham (10)

3. U.S. Amateur champions
Dick Chapman (a), Skee Riegel (9,a)

4. British Open champions
Denny Shute (6), Sam Snead (6,9,10,12)

5. British Amateur champions
Frank Stranahan (8,9,11,a), Robert Sweeny Jr. (a)

6. PGA champions
Jim Ferrier (9), Vic Ghezzi (9,10), Bob Hamilton (9), Johnny Revolta

7. Members of the U.S. 1949 Ryder Cup team
Team not selected in time for inclusion.

8. Members of the U.S. 1949 Walker Cup team
Team not selected in time for inclusion.

9. Top 24 players and ties from the 1948 Masters Tournament
Art Bell, Johnny Bulla (10,12), Ed Dudley (17), Ed Furgol, Fred Haas, Chick Harbert (12), Dutch Harrison, Dick Metz, Cary Middlecoff (10), Al Smith (10), Harry Todd

Ben Hogan (2,6,10,12) did not play.

10. Top 24 players and ties from the 1948 U.S. Open
Skip Alexander, Herman Barron, Leland Gibson, Otto Greiner, Joe Kirkwood Jr., Jug McSpaden, Toney Penna, George Schneiter, Herschel Spears, Jim Turnesa, Ellsworth Vines

Charles Congdon and Smiley Quick did not play.

11. 1948 U.S. Amateur quarter-finalists
Charles Coe (a), Gene Dahlbender (a), Jimmy McGonagill (a)

Ray Billows (a), Bruce McCormick (a) and Willie Turnesa (3,5,a) did not play.

12. 1948 PGA Championship quarter-finalists
George Fazio, Mike Turnesa

13. One amateur, not already qualified, selected by a ballot of ex-U.S. Amateur champions
Johnny Dawson (a)

14. One professional, not already qualified, selected by a ballot of ex-U.S. Open champions
Johnny Palmer

15. Two players, not already qualified, with the best scoring average in the winter part of the 1950 PGA Tour
Pete Cooper, Clayton Heafner

16 Winner of  1948 Inter-service Invitational tournament
Fred Moseley (a)

17 Home club professional

18. Foreign invitations
John de Bendern (5,a), Tony Holguin, Bobby Locke (9,10)

Round summaries

First round
Thursday, April 7, 1949

Source:

Second round
Friday, April 8, 1949

Source:

Third round
Saturday, April 9, 1949

Source:

Final round
Sunday, April 10, 1949

Final leaderboard

Sources:

Scorecard

Cumulative tournament scores, relative to par

References

External links
Masters.com – past winners and results
Augusta.com – 1949 Masters leaderboard and scorecards

1949
1949 in golf
1949 in American sports
1949 in sports in Georgia (U.S. state)
April 1949 sports events in the United States